D301 is a state road connecting A9 with Novigrad and D21 state road. The road is 17.0 km long.

The road, as well as all other state roads in Croatia, is managed and maintained by Hrvatske ceste, a state owned company.

Traffic volume 

Traffic is regularly counted and reported by Hrvatske ceste, operator of the road. Substantial variations between annual (AADT) and summer (ASDT) traffic volumes are attributed to the fact that the road connects A9 motorway carrying substantial tourist traffic to Novigrad, a major summer resort.

Road junctions and populated areas

See also
 Istrian Y

Sources

State roads in Croatia
Transport in Istria County